Aleksandar Kirov (born 25 October 1990) is a Bulgarian footballer who plays as a forward for Lokomotiv GO.

Career

Youth career
He comes directly from Levski Sofia`s Youth Academy. Kirov made his official debut for Levski's "A" Team on 22 September 2007 against Cherno More Varna. Kirov played as a sub and entered the match in 67th minute. Levski won by the result of 4:0, but Kirov didn't score a goal.

PFC Levski Sofia
Kirov made his seasonly debut for Levski in the beginning of the 09/10 season on 21 July 2009 in the second match of the 2nd Qualifying round of UEFA Champions League, where Levski defeated the team of UE Sant Julià. The result of the match was 0:5 with a guest win for Levski. Kirov scored the fifth goal in the 87th minute.

On 9 June 2010, Kirov returned to PFC Levski Sofia after a loan period.

PFC Lokomotiv Mezdra
On 12 January 2010, Kirov was transferred to PFC Lokomotiv Mezdra on loan for six months. He made his debut for the team on 13 March 2010. Kirov scored 1 goal in 9 matches. After a season spent there, he started training for the next one with PFC Levski Sofia.

Tsarsko Selo
Kirov played for Tsarsko Selo in the first half of the 2016–17 Second League season but was released in December 2016.

Lokomotiv GO
In July 2017, Kirov joined Lokomotiv Gorna Oryahovitsa.

Career Stats
As of 12 June 2011.

References

External links
 Profile at levskisofia.info
 

1990 births
Living people
Footballers from Sofia
Bulgarian footballers
Bulgaria under-21 international footballers
PFC Levski Sofia players
PFC Lokomotiv Mezdra players
PFC Spartak Pleven players
FC Botev Vratsa players
FC Montana players
FC Tsarsko Selo Sofia players
FC Lokomotiv Gorna Oryahovitsa players
First Professional Football League (Bulgaria) players
Second Professional Football League (Bulgaria) players
Bulgarian expatriate footballers
Bulgarian expatriate sportspeople in Austria
Expatriate footballers in Austria
Association football forwards